The Scottish Junior Football Association, East Region is one of two regions of the SJFA, which currently organises the Midlands League and local cup competitions.

The SJFA was previously split into six regions, but in 2002 the decision was taken to reform into three to try to ensure more games between the top clubs and hence increase their revenues; at that time the East Region was created by amalgamating the former East (Lothians), Fife and Tayside Regions. From 2017, the majority of the region's ~60 member clubs left the SJFA to join the East of Scotland Football League within the Scottish football league system's pyramid structure. in 2021, what remained of the East Region (17 Tayside clubs) was integrated into this 'senior' pyramid as the Midlands League alongside the relatively unchanged SJFA North Region divisions, below the Highland Football League – the third SJFA region, West, had already disbanded a year earlier and formed its own divisions in the senior pyramid.

League structure

Until 2006–07
For season 2002–03, twelve clubs from the East (Lothians), Fife and Tayside leagues in the eastern part of Scotland combined to create the East Super League; this was fed by the existing regional leagues: Tayside Premier (with Tayside Division One below), Fife District League and Lothians Division One (with Lothians Division Two below.) A similar change occurred in the west of Scotland where the Ayrshire and Central leagues merged entirely to form a West Region. A year earlier, the North Region was renamed, but this had no impact on the system itself.

2006–07 to 2012–13
In 2006, a further reorganisation led to the creation of another region-wide tier below the East Super League, known as the East Premier League. Below this, the Regional leagues were streamlined into single North (Tayside), Central (Fife) and South (Lothians) Divisions. To balance the numbers in these new leagues, the majority of Perthshire clubs were re-allocated from the North to the Central Division (exceptions to this were Blairgowrie and Coupar Angus who remained in the North Division setup).

As of the end of 2006–07 season, clubs were promoted and relegated between the Super League and the Premier League. One club from each of the lowest-tier divisions would be promoted to the Premier League, with three Premier League sides relegated to a regional division corresponding to their geographical area.

2013–14 to 2016–17
As agreed at the 2011–12 East Region AGM, the leagues were restructured into four divisions from the 2013–14 season. The Super League and Premier League were expanded from twelve to sixteen clubs while the regional divisions were merged into two from the current three and branded as North and South; clubs in the Central division were split between the two new leagues on a geographical basis. The League Cup competitions which traditionally opened the season were also scrapped as part of these proposals.

2017–18 to 2018–19 
In 2017, Kelty Hearts left the league to join the East of Scotland Football League in the senior pyramid. The following April, thirteen clubs—most of them from the East Juniors—moved to the East of Scotland League for the 2018–19 season. When the window for applications was extended, even more East Region clubs quit the Junior grade, bringing the total of clubs leaving Junior football that summer to 24:

 Arniston Rangers
 Blackburn United
 Bo'ness United
 Bonnyrigg Rose Athletic
 Broxburn Athletic
 Camelon Juniors

 Craigroyston
 Crossgates Primrose
 Dalkeith Thistle
 Dunbar United
 Dundonald Bluebell
 Easthouses Lily MW

 Edinburgh United
 Haddington Athletic
 Hill of Beath Hawthorn
 Jeanfield Swifts
 Linlithgow Rose
 Musselburgh Athletic

 Newtongrange Star
 Oakley United
 Penicuik Athletic
 Sauchie Juniors
 St Andrews United
 Tranent Juniors

The loss of clubs caused the league to restructure from four divisions to three, effectively removing the Premier League and rearranging the 36 clubs into a 12-team Super League with two 12-team North and South divisions below. Glenrothes and Kinnoull also made the move to the senior pyramid in summer 2019.

From 2019–20 
The entire region was split into north and south sections, each containing a 10-team Super League and a 8 or 10-team Premier League below. Four clubs joined the South Premier League: Bo'ness United Junior, Linlithgow Rose Community, Syngenta, and Sauchie Juniors Community.

In April 2020, the 2019–20 season was declared null and void due to the COVID-19 pandemic, and the next month it was confirmed that a further eight clubs, mostly from Fife, were leaving the East Juniors for the East of Scotland League:

Kennoway Star Hearts
Kirkcaldy & Dysart
Lochgelly Albert
Lochore Welfare

Luncarty
Newburgh
Rosyth
Thornton Hibs

For the 2020–21 season, the remaining 30 clubs were merged into a single tier split into a Tayside League and Lothian League, later renamed Premiership North (17 clubs) and Premiership South (13 clubs). Matches restarted on 21 November 2020, but the season was declared null and void again on 16 March 2021.

In April 2021 another eleven clubs announced they were leaving the East Juniors for the East of Scotland League:

Armadale Thistle
Bathgate Thistle
Bo'ness United (now called Bo'ness Athletic}
Fauldhouse United
Harthill Royal (applied to join West of Scotland Football League)
Livingston United

Pumpherston
Stoneyburn
Syngenta
West Calder United
Whitburn

Also in April 2021 it was announced that discussions were ongoing for clubs in the East Premiership North to form Midlands League at Tier 6 in the Scottish football league system, that would ultimately see clubs in the Midlands League play off against those in the North Caledonian League and North Superleague for a place in the Highland League. Although there was no official announcement of the league's formation, the East Region announced the fixtures for the 2021-22 season straight away on 21 June, with 19 clubs shown as league members, Dundee St James and Letham being new clubs in addition to all members of the 2020–21 East Premiership North.

Cup competitions
There are a number of cup competitions in the East Region:
 East Region League Cup - Known as the Thorntons Property East Region League Cup under a sponsorship arrangement, this tournament was introduced for the 2018–19 season to compensate for a reduced number of league fixtures. 
North and Tayside Inter-Regional Cup - Known as the Quest Engineering Cup for sponsorship purposes, this is a knockout tournament for Midlands League and North Region clubs and is administered by a joint committee. First played for in 1988, clubs play early rounds in their own region with eight sides from each area progressing to the last sixteen.
Inactive

 Prior to league reconstruction in 2013, clubs also competed in one of three League Cup competitions at the beginning of the season:
 DJ Laing League Cup. This tournament was for former Tayside Region clubs excluding Perthshire sides affiliated to the Central Division. Clubs initially competed in groups (sections) with the group winners advancing to a knockout semi-final stage. In all league cup competitions, matches in the group stages were played under league rules so a player was not cup-tied by turning out for a particular club.
 ACA Sports League Cup. This tournament was for former Fife Region clubs and all other teams affiliated to the Central Division. Clubs initially competed in four groups, with group winners advancing to a knockout semi-final stage.
 Dechmont Forklift League Cup. This tournament was for former East (Lothian) Region clubs. Clubs initially competed in four groups, with group winners advancing to a knockout semi-final stage.

 Fife & Lothians Cup - Known as the V Tech SMT Fife and Lothians Cup under a sponsorship arrangement, this tournament dates back to regionalisation in 1968 and is a knockout tournament for former East (Lothians) and Fife Region clubs in the current East Region. It is administered by a separate Fife & Lothians committee.
 East of Scotland Cup - Known as the DJ Laing East Region Cup under a sponsorship arrangement, this is a knockout tournament for all Midlands League clubs. The competition dates back to 1896–97 and was the most prestigious cup trophy in the former East Region.

Holders
2021–22 winners unless stated.

North and Tayside Inter-Regional Cup: East Craigie
East Region League Cup: Lochee United

Roll of Honour

Member clubs for 2022–23 season
There are 27 clubs in the East Region for the 2022–23 season. 19 clubs in the Midlands League organised by the East Region, and 8 clubs transferred to the East of Scotland League who have retained their membership of the SJFA.

Notes

References

External links
 SJFA East Region Website
Fife Junior History, Eric R. Thomson

 
Football in Dundee
Football in Perth and Kinross
Football in Angus, Scotland
Football in Fife
Football in East Lothian
Football in Edinburgh
Football in Midlothian
Football in West Lothian
Football in Falkirk (council area)
Football in Clackmannanshire